Stewart Douglas McPhee (born 5 January 1965) is an English former footballer who played as a midfielder in the Football League for Darlington, for Whitby Town in the Northern League, and for Stockton. He was on Middlesbrough's books, but never played for them in the League.

References

1965 births
Living people
Footballers from Middlesbrough
English footballers
Association football midfielders
Whitby Town F.C. players
Darlington F.C. players
Norton & Stockton Ancients F.C. players
Northern Football League players
English Football League players
Middlesbrough F.C. players